The Finland women's national football team, also known as nickname The Boreal Owls, represents Finland in international women's football.  The team, controlled by the Football Association of Finland (SPL/FBF), reached the semi-finals of the 2005 European Championship, surprising the female football world having drawn with Sweden and beaten Denmark. Finland hosted the 2009 EC finals.

The Finnish team has had a few players that are considered to be among the best in women's football, such as Laura Österberg Kalmari, Sanna Valkonen and Anne Mäkinen.

As of August 2022, the team is ranked 29th in the FIFA world ranking. From 2004 to 2010 the typical ranking was 16th.

History

The beginning
The Finland women's national football team played its first international match in 1973 against Sweden. The game was played in Mariehamn, Åland.

Team image

Nicknames
The Finland women's national football team has been known or nicknamed as the "Helmarit (the Boreal Owls)".

Results and fixtures

The following is a list of match results in the last 12 months, as well as any future matches that have been scheduled.

2022

2023

Coaching staff

Current coaching staff
As of August 2022

 Head coach: Marko Saloranta (interim)
 Assistant coach: Marianne Miettinen
 Assistant coach: Mika Sankala
 Assistant coach: Ann-Helen Grahm
 Goalkeeping coach: Aki Moilanen

Manager history

Players

Current squad

Finland
The squad was announced on 9 June 2022 for Women Euro 2022.

Stats after match with  Germany on 17 July 2022.
Head coach:  Anna Signeul

Recent call ups
The following players have been called up to the squad in the past 12 months.

Records

*Active players in bold, statistics correct as of 9 July 2022

Most capped players

Source:

Top goalscorers

Source:

Competitive record

FIFA Women's World Cup

*Draws include knockout matches decided on penalty kicks.

UEFA Women's Championship

*Draws include knockout matches decided on penalty kicks.

Cyprus Women's Cup

Nordic Football Championship

See also

Sports in Finland
Football in Finland
Football Association of Finland (SPL)
Finland women's national under-20 football team
Finland women's national under-17 football team
Finland national football team

References

External links
Official website
FIFA profile

 
European women's national association football teams
national